The 2nd Platino Awards were presented at the Starlite Auditorio in Marbella, Spain on July 18, 2015 to honour the best in Ibero-American films of 2014. 

Wild Tales received the most nominations with ten.

Wild Tales won eight awards including Best Ibero-American Film, Platino Award for Best Director for Damián Szifron and Platino Award for Best Actress for Érica Rivas.

Winners and nominees

Major awards

Honorary Platino
Antonio Banderas

Films with multiple nominations and awards 

The following films received multiple nominations:

The following films received multiple awards:

References

External links
 Official site

2
Platino Awards
2015 in Andalusia